Johnny Ryan (born 5 September 1988), is an Irish sportsperson.  He plays hurling with his local club Drom & Inch and has been a member of the Tipperary senior inter-county hurling team since 2012.

Career
In 2006 Ryan won an All-Ireland Minor Hurling medal with Tipperary playing in goals. In 2009 Johnny won a Munster Under-21 Hurling Championship for Tipperary. In 2011 Johnny was Man of the Match in Drom & Inch's first ever county final win playing at midfield.

On 11 March 2012, Ryan made his senior Tipperary debut against Galway in the 2012 National Hurling League, coming on as a substitute and scoring a point in a 2-20 a 2-18 win.

Honours

Tipperary 
All-Ireland Minor Hurling Championship:
Winner (1): 2006
Munster Minor Hurling Championship:
Winner (0):
Runner-up (1): 2006
Munster Under-21 Hurling Championship:
Winner (1):
Waterford Crystal Cup:
Winner (1): 2012
Munster Senior Hurling Championship:
Winner (1):

Drom & Inch
Tipperary Senior Hurling Championship:
Winner (1): 2011

References

External links
Tipperary Player Profile

1988 births
Living people
Drom-Inch hurlers
Tipperary inter-county hurlers